Childwall is a Liverpool City Council Ward in the Liverpool Wavertree Parliamentary constituency. The population of this ward at the 2011 census was 13,098. The ward boundary was changed at the 2004 municipal elections to take in a small part of the former Valley ward and losing part to the new Wavertree ward.

Councillors

 indicates seat up for re-election after boundary changes.

 indicates seat up for re-election.

 indicates change in affiliation.

 indicates seat up for re-election after casual vacancy.

Election results

Elections of the 2020s

Elections of the 2010s

Elections of the 2000s 

After the boundary change of 2004 the whole of Liverpool City Council faced election. Three Councillors were returned.

'∗ - Denotes sitting Councillor.

External links
Ward Profile

References

Wards of Liverpool